Fantasy Hotel (Traditional Chinese: 開心賓館) is a TVB modern drama series broadcast in July 2005.

Synopsis
Hong Kong's top tour guide
Experience the ups and downs of life in a hotel

There are three tour guides, Kam Ji-Kit (Michael Tao), Yung Ka-Man (Melissa Ng), and Hon Shan (Wayne Lai) lead tours from mainland China. One day, unexpectedly, a friend Kam Kong-Hoi (Wu Fung), gives them his hotel to take care of. Suddenly, the three are bosses and need to improve the hotel for the sake of their friend. Along the way, Ka-Man develops feelings for Ji-Kit, but because of a misunderstanding, she tries to stop her growing feelings for him. When Ji-Kit eventually finds out how Ka-Man feels towards him, he tries to court her but Ka-Man is too afraid of getting hurt.

Cast

Viewership ratings

References

External links
TVB.com Fantasy Hotel - Official Website 

TVB dramas
2005 Hong Kong television series debuts
2005 Hong Kong television series endings